Choi Seong-gon (6 May 1922 – 1951) was a South Korean footballer who played as a midfielder. He competed in the men's tournament at the 1948 Summer Olympics.

References

External links
 

1922 births
1951 deaths
South Korean footballers
South Korea international footballers
Olympic footballers of South Korea
Footballers at the 1948 Summer Olympics
Sportspeople from Ulsan
Association football midfielders